Mehmet Cavit Bey, Mehmed Cavid Bey or Mehmed Djavid Bey (1875 – 26 August 1926) was an Ottoman economist, newspaper editor and leading politician during the dissolution period of the Ottoman Empire. A founding member of the Committee of Union and Progress (CUP), he was part of the Young Turks and had positions in government after the constitution was re-established. In the beginning of the Republican period, he was executed for alleged involvement in an assassination attempt against Mustafa Kemal Atatürk.

Early years and career

Cavit was born in the Salonica Vilayet of the Ottoman Empire (modern day Thessaloniki). His father was Naim, a merchant, and his mother was Pakize; they were cousins. His family had links to followers of Sabbatai Zevi, and he was a Dönme. He learnt Greek and French, attending the progressive Şemsi Efendi School, the same school as Mustafa Kemal Pasha. He attended Mülkiye academy in Istanbul for civil servants, and upon graduation he secured employment with a state bank, and at the same time taught economics and worked within the Ministry of Education.

Cavit was more successful than the average state employee in Istanbul, but for unknown reasons he decided to leave his budding career and move back to Salonica. As fears of collapse grew in Salonica amidst the spreading insurrections and violence of the Balkans and the autocratic rule and inaction of Abdülhamid II, foreign influence over the Ottoman state also grew (along with the nation's debt). Cavid and other supporters of the Ottoman nation came to believe that the sultan had to step aside for the good of the empire. This core group founded the Committee of Union and Progress (CUP), called the Young Turks by foreign press.

After the proclamation of the Second Constitution in 1908, he was elected deputy of Salonica and Kale-i Sultaniye (Çanakkale) into the parliament in Constantinople. Following the 31 March Incident in 1909, Cavit Bey was appointed minister of finance in the cabinet of Grand Vizier Tevfik Pasha. In the aftermath of the Savior Officer insurrection and repression of the CUP, Cavit hid in a French battleship and escaped to Marseilles. Cavit would regain his position in the wake of Grand Vizier Mahmud Şevket Pasha's assassination.

Following the orchestrated Black Sea Raid on Russian ports in 1914, Cavit resigned. For the next few weeks, central committee brother Dr. Mehmed Nazım himself also a Dönme would bully Cavit for being a "treacherous Jew". He remained an influential figure in the Empire's dealings with Germany until he returned to his post in February 1917. Up to the Armistice of Mudros in 1918 following the World War I, Cavit Bey played an important role in the CUP. Cavit Bey represented the Ottoman Empire in postwar financial negotiations in London and Berlin.

During World War I, Cavid was not fully trusted by the CUP leadership. He did not find out about the Armenian genocide until August 1915, and condemned it in his diary, writing "Ottoman history has never opened its pages, even during the time of the Middle Ages, onto such determined murder[s] and large scale cruelty."
He lamented, "With these acts we have [ruined] everything. We put an irremovable stain on the current administration."

Republican period

In 1921, Mehmet Cavit Bey married Nazlıyar Hanım, the divorced wife of Şehzade Mehmed Burhaneddin. In 1924, their son Osman Şiar was born.  After Cavit Bey's execution, his son was raised by his close friend Hüseyin Cahit Yalçın. Following the enactment of the Surname Law in 1934, Osman Şiar adopted the surname Yalçın.

In the early period of the Republican era, Mehmet Cavit Bey was charged with involvement in the assassination attempt in Izmir against Mustafa Kemal Pasha. After a widespread government investigation, Cavit Bey was convicted and later executed by hanging on August 26, 1926, in Ankara.

The letters which Cavit Bey wrote to his wife Aliye Nazlı during his imprisonment were given to her only after his execution. She had the letters published later as a book entitled, Zindandan Mektuplar ("Letters from the Dungeon").

In 1950, Cavit Bey's remains were transferred and reinterred at the Cebeci Asri Cemetery in Ankara.

Bibliography
Zindandan Mektuplar (2005) Liberte Yayınları, 212 pp.

References 

1875 births
1926 deaths
Sabbateans
Writers from Thessaloniki
People from Salonica vilayet
Turkish non-fiction writers
Turkish economists
Turkish newspaper editors
Government ministers of the Ottoman Empire
Burials at Cebeci Asri Cemetery
Committee of Union and Progress politicians
People executed by Turkey by hanging
20th-century executions for treason
People executed for treason against Turkey
Turkish people of Jewish descent
Politicians from Thessaloniki